Kottabos was an Irish literary magazine, published from 1869 to 1893 at Trinity College, Dublin. Over the years many authors contributed to the journal, like Edward Dowden, Alfred Perceval Graves and Oscar Wilde, who had early work published in it, during his period at Trinity. 
The magazine contained translations, parodies, lyrics, and light verse, mostly written in English, but also in Greek and Latin. Most contributions were of a "playful character."

The magazine was published in Dublin by W. McGee and appeared three times a year. 

The name "Kottabos" was taken from the Greek drinking game Kottabos. 

Robert Yelverton Tyrrell was the first editor-in-chief.

Adolphus Ward and Alfred Rayney Waller, in their The Cambridge History of English and American Literature, say that Kottabos is "perhaps the cream of Irish academic wit and scholarship."

Editors and issues 
Tyrrell explained in 1906 that he started "a College miscellany of Greek and Latin verse (mainly translations), and of English pieces, verse and prose (mainly original)" shortly after his election as a fellow of Trinity College in 1868. He soon obtained help of John Martley.

The journal was issued three times a year, corresponding to the three College terms. The first two issues where published in 1969. According to Tyrrell a first volume was issued in 1874, at the end of four years, embracing twelve numbers. Then in 1877 and 1881 two further volumes appeared, with an equal number of parts. This made a total of 36 numbers.

In 1888 the magazine revived under the editorship of J.B. Bury. He edited a volume, that was  completed in 1891. The last volume, edited by George Wilkins, appeared in 1895. The total numbers issued thus became fifty.

Contributors 
Contributors to Kottabos were among many others:
 William Macneile Dixon (1866-1946), author and academic. He contributed for instance:
 1891, a poem, titled "An Allegory"
 1891, a poem, titled "Lilies"

 Edward Dowden (1843–1913), poet (contributed as: E.D.). Some of his contributions were:
 fourth issue (1870), a poem, titled "David and Michal"
 fifth issue (1870), a poem, titled "A Farewell"
 sixth issue (1871), a poem, titled "In a June Night"  
 seventh issue (1871), three poems, titled "Songs"

 Alfred Perceval Graves (1846–1931), poet and songwriter, who contributed to Kottabos as an undergraduate with the initials "A.P.G." Among his contributions were:
 first issue (1869), a very short text
 fifth issue (1870), a poem, titled "Song" 
 sixth issue (1871), a poem, titled "Grace" 
 seventh issue (1871), a poem (in Latin), titled "Mors Ultima Linea Rerum" 
 14th issue (1873), a poem "Divini Gloria Ruris"
 16th issue (1874), a very small contribution entitled "Versus impariter iuncti"

 Richard Frederick Littledale (1833-1890), clergyman and writer, contributed (as R.F.L.):
 the essay "Oxford Solar Myth. A Contribution to Comparative Mythology."

 Standish James O'Grady (1846–1928), historian (S. O'G.) contributed:
 the poem "The Old Parson and the New. A Lay Addressed to Divinity Students" in the first issue of Kottabos (1869)

 John Todhunter (1839–1916), poet (J.T.). He contributed:
 the poem titled "Louise"

 Oscar Wilde (1854–1900), poet and playwright, who contributed as "O.F. O'F. W.W." to the second volume (1877): 
 "A fragment from the Agamemnon of Aeschylos"
 the poem "A Night Vision"

Echoes 
In 1906 Robert V. Tyrrell published Echoes from Kottabos, with the editorial help of Sir Edward Sullivan, 2nd Baronet (1852-1928), as an anthology for the magazine:
 

In the "Preface" Tyrrell shortly describes the history of the magazine. He also explains the title. The editors remark that a complete set of Kottabos now (1906) is very rare (they guess that not more than half a dozen are extant). 

The book is split into three parts–Verse, Prose and Latin rhymes. Classical exercises were not admitted, because a selection from these had been published in elsewhere. Special mention is made of the prose contribution titled "Oxford Solar Myth. A Contribution to Comparative Mythology"  by the Rev. R. Littledale.

Sources

References

External links
 Digital edition of the first eight issues of Kottabos in HathiTrust Digital Library
 New series, volume 1 (1891) in Internet Archive

Literary magazines published in Ireland
Triannual magazines
Multilingual magazines
Magazines established in 1869
Magazines disestablished in 1893